Fated is the third studio album by American electronic musician Nosaj Thing. It was released on May 4, 2015.

Critical reception
At Metacritic, which assigns a weighted average score out of 100 to reviews from mainstream critics, Fated received an average score of 63% based on 8 reviews, indicating "generally favorable reviews".

Track listing

Charts

References

External links
 

2015 albums
Nosaj Thing albums
Innovative Leisure albums